{{DISPLAYTITLE:Gallium (68Ga) gozetotide}}

Gallium (68Ga) gozetotide, sold under the brand name Illuccix among others, is a radiopharmaceutical made of 68Ga conjugated to prostate-specific membrane antigen (PSMA) targeting ligand, Glu-Urea-Lys(Ahx)-HBED-CC, used for imaging prostate cancer by positron emission tomography (PET). The PSMA targeting ligand specifically directs the radiolabeled imaging agent towards the prostate cancerous lesions in men. 

The most common side effects with gallium (68Ga)-radiolabelled gozetotide are tiredness, nausea (feeling sick), constipation and vomiting.

Gallium (68Ga) gozetotide was approved for medical use in the United States in December 2021, and in the European Union in December 2022. It is the first drug approved by the US Food and Drug Administration (FDA) as a PET imaging agent.

Medical uses 
Gallium (68Ga) gozetotide is a radioactive diagnostic agent indicated for positron emission tomography (PET) of prostate-specific membrane antigen (PSMA)-positive lesions in men with prostate cancer.

Ga 68 PSMA-11 injections are used for PET imaging of prostate-specific membrane antigen (PSMA) positive lesions in males with prostate cancer. It can be given for the patients with suspected metastasis, and the candidates with initial definitive therapy.

Development
Initially gallium (68Ga) chloride solution injections used for radiolabelling, in 2019 European Pharmacopoeia mentions gallium (68Ga) DOTATOC injection for radiolabelling and PET imaging.

Ga 68 PSMA-11 is co-developed by University of California, Los Angeles and University of California, San Francisco, they conducted phase III clinical trial. In December 2020, the drug was first approved by US Food and Drug Administration (FDA) for PET imaging.

Mechanism of action
Gallium (68Ga) gozetotide binds with prostate-specific membrane antigen (PSMA). This binds to cells that express PSMA, including malignant prostate cancer cells. The radioactive isotope of gallium, 68Ga is responsible for emitting β+ radiations and X-rays. This helps in recording images by positron emission tomography (PET) and CT scan.

Society and culture

Legal status 
On 13 October 2022, the Committee for Medicinal Products for Human Use (CHMP) of the European Medicines Agency (EMA) adopted a positive opinion, recommending the granting of a marketing authorization for the medicinal product Locametz, intended for the diagnosis of prostate cancer. The applicant for this medicinal product is Novartis Europharm Limited. Locametz was approved for medical use in the European Union in December 2022.

Names 
Gallium (68Ga) gozetotide is the international nonproprietary name (INN).

References

External links 
 

Gallium compounds
Radiopharmaceuticals